The 1984 United States presidential election in Kansas took place on November 6, 1984. All 50 states and the District of Columbia, were part of the 1984 United States presidential election. Voters chose seven electors to the Electoral College, which selected the president and vice president of the United States. Kansas was won by incumbent United States President Ronald Reagan of California, who was running against former Vice President Walter Mondale of Minnesota. Reagan ran for a second time with incumbent Vice President and former C.I.A. Director George H. W. Bush of Texas, and Mondale ran with Representative Geraldine Ferraro of New York, the first major female candidate for the vice presidency.

The presidential election of 1984 was a very partisan election for Kansas, with just under 99% of the electorate voting for either the Democratic or Republican parties, though several parties appeared on the ballot.  In typical form for the time, nearly every county in Kansas voted in majority for the Republican candidate, a particularly strong turn out even in this typically conservative-leaning state. The only exception to this trend was Kansas City's Wyandotte County, which voted primarily Democratic.

In this election, Kansas voted about 7% more Republican than the national average. Reagan won the election in Kansas with a highly decisive 32-point landslide. While Kansas typically votes conservative in the modern era, the election results in Kansas are also reflective of a nationwide reconsolidation of the base for the Republican Party which took place through the 1980s; called by Reagan the "second American Revolution." This was most evident during the 1984 presidential election. Kansas also continued its age-old trend of voting in par with its sister Great Plains States (North Dakota, South Dakota, and Nebraska), a trend that has not been broken in any presidential election since 1920.

It is speculated that Mondale lost support with voters nearly immediately during the campaign, namely during his acceptance speech at the 1984 Democratic National Convention. There he stated that he intended to increase taxes. To quote Mondale, "By the end of my first term, I will reduce the Reagan budget deficit by two thirds. Let's tell the truth. It must be done, it must be done. Mr. Reagan will raise taxes, and so will I. He won't tell you. I just did."  Despite this claimed attempt at establishing truthfulness with the electorate, this claim to raise taxes badly eroded his chances in what had already begun as an uphill battle against the charismatic Ronald Reagan. Reagan also enjoyed high levels of bipartisan support during the 1984 presidential election, both in Kansas, and across the nation at large. Many registered Democrats who voted for Reagan (Reagan Democrats) stated that they had chosen to do so because they associated him with the economic recovery, because of his strong stance on national security issues with Russia, and because they considered the Democrats as "supporting American poor and minorities at the expense of the middle class."  These public opinion factors contributed to Reagan's 1984 landslide victory, in Kansas and elsewhere.

Democratic platform
Walter Mondale accepted the Democratic nomination for presidency after pulling narrowly ahead of Senator Gary Hart of Colorado and Rev. Jesse Jackson of Illinois - his main contenders during what would be a very contentious Democratic primary. During the primary campaign, Mondale was vocal about reduction of government spending, and, in particular, was vocal against heightened military spending on the nuclear arms race against the Soviet Union, which was reaching its peak on both sides in the early 1980s.

Taking a (what was becoming the traditional liberal) stance on the social issues of the day, Mondale advocated for gun control, the right to choose regarding abortion, and strongly opposed the repeal of laws regarding institutionalized prayer in public schools. He also criticized Reagan for his economic marginalization of the poor, stating that Reagan's reelection campaign was "a happy talk campaign," not focused on the real issues at hand.

A very significant political move during this election: the Democratic Party nominated Representative Geraldine Ferraro to run with Mondale as Vice-President. Ferraro is the first female candidate to receive such a nomination in United States history. She said in an interview at the 1984 Democratic National Convention that this action "opened a door which will never be closed again," speaking to the role of women in politics.

Republican platform

By 1984, Reagan was very popular with voters across the nation as the President who saw them out of the economic stagflation of the early and middle 1970's, and into a period of (relative) economic stability.

The economic success seen under Reagan was politically accomplished (principally) in two ways. The first was initiation of deep tax cuts for the wealthy, and the second was a wide-spectrum of tax cuts for crude oil production and refinement, namely, with the 1980 Windfall profits tax cuts. These policies were augmented with a call for heightened military spending, the cutting of social welfare programs for the poor, and the increasing of taxes on those making less than $50,000 per year. Collectively called "Reaganomics", these economic policies were established through several pieces of legislation passed between 1980 and 1987.

Virtually unopposed during the Republican primaries, Reagan ran on a campaign of furthering his economic policies. Reagan vowed to continue his "war on drugs," passing sweeping legislation after the 1984 election in support of mandatory minimum sentences for drug possession.  Furthermore, taking a (what was becoming the traditional conservative) stance on the social issues of the day, Reagan strongly opposed legislation regarding comprehension of gay marriage, abortion, and (to a lesser extent) environmentalism, regarding the final as simply being bad for business.

Results

Results by county

See also
 United States presidential elections in Kansas
 Presidency of Ronald Reagan

References

Kansas
1984
1984 Kansas elections